The 1958 Toledo Rockets football team was an American football team that represented Toledo University in the Mid-American Conference (MAC) during the 1958 NCAA University Division football season. In their second season under head coach Harry Larche, the Rockets compiled a 4–5 record (1–4 against MAC opponents), finished in sixth place in the MAC, and were outscored by their opponents by a combined total of 168 to 122.

The team's statistical leaders included Jerry Stoltz with 403 passing yards, Occie Burt with 618 rushing yards, and Jack Campbell with 214 receiving yards.

Schedule

References

Toledo
Toledo Rockets football seasons
Toledo Rockets football